Resources Capital Football Club is a Hong Kong professional football club which currently competes in the Hong Kong Premier League. It was known as Tai Chung Football Club for the first 34 years of its existence before rebranding in 2016. 

The club plays its home matches at Tsing Yi Sports Ground.

History
Tai Chung has competed in the Hong Kong football league system league since 2001. Between 2009 and 2011, Tai Chung once competed in the First Division, the top-flight league in Hong Kong at that time. Since their relegation in 2011, the club has competed in the second-tier amateur league.

In 2016, the club was acquired by Tang Wai Ho, and was renamed as Resources Capital.

Ahead of the 2019–20 season, club ownership increased the budget to $6 million and turned the club into a professional outfit, aiming to gain promotion to the Hong Kong Premier League in the following season. Despite the cancellation of the 2019–20 season due to the COVID-19 pandemic in Hong Kong, Resources Capital were granted promotion to the Hong Kong Premier League by the HKFA board of directors.

Name history 
1982–2005: Tai Chung (大中)
2005–2008: EU Tai Chung (東盟大中)
2008–2009: Advance Tai Chung (駿昇大中)
2009–2016: Tai Chung (大中)
2016–: Resources Capital (晉峰)

Team staff
{|class="wikitable"
|-
!Position
!Staff
|-
|Director of Football||  Ho Shun Yin
|-
|Head coach||  Joan Esteva
|-
|Assistant coach||  Cheung Wai Chung
|-
|Assistant coach||  Yeung Hin Fai
|-
|Goalkeeping coach||  Ho Kwok Chuen
|-
|Fitness coach||  Cheng Chun Hin
|-
|Fitness coach||  Ho Ho Yee

Current squad

First Team

 FP 

 FP 

 FP 

 FP
 FP 

FP

 FP

Remarks:
LP These players are registered as local players in Hong Kong domestic football competitions.
FP These players are registered as foreign players.

Out on loan

Recent seasons

Honours

League
 Hong Kong Second Division
Runners-up (1): 2008–09
 Hong Kong Third A Division
Champions (1): 2006–07

Cup
 Hong Kong FA Cup Junior Division
Runners-up (1): 2018–19

Head coaches
 Chan Ho Yin (2009–2010)
 Dejan Antonić (2010–2011)
 Tim Bredbury (2012–2013)
 Yu Siu Chee (2013–2015)
 Ho Shun Yin (2015–2019)
 Joan Esteva (2019–2022)
 Tang Kwun Yin (2022)
 Joan Esteva (2022–)

References

External links
 Resources Capital at HKFA
 Resources Capital on Facebook

Football clubs in Hong Kong
Hong Kong First Division League
1982 establishments in Hong Kong